Lake Alice National Wildlife Refuge is located in Ramsey and Towner Counties near the town of Church's Ferry, North Dakota. These watersheds cover  of land and provide ample water to Lake Alice National Wildlife Refuge. All of these watercourses are considered intermittent, but they are prone to flooding in spring and during heavy rainstorms.

The Refuge was first established in 1935 as an easement refuge. The Refuge lands were privately owned, and no hunting was allowed. In 1972, the U.S. Fish and Wildlife Service purchased  of the original easement refuge. The Service now manages  at Lake Alice National Wildlife Refuge.

References
Refuge website

National Wildlife Refuges in North Dakota
Easement refuges in North Dakota
Protected areas of Ramsey County, North Dakota
Protected areas of Towner County, North Dakota
Protected areas established in 1935